MT103 (Message Type 103) is a specific SWIFT message types/format used on the Society for Worldwide Interbank Financial Telecommunication (SWIFT) payment system to send for cross border/international wire transfer messages between financial institutions for customer cash transfers.

MT103 fields 
Below are the fields of an MT103 message. These fields are referred to as tags.

In the above table, tags 52, 53, 54, 55, 56, and 57 preferably contain ISO 9362 Business Identifier Codes (BICs), whereas tags 50 and 59 preferably contain an account number or a BIC(Business Identifier Codes).

As per SWIFT standards, the account number is to be in IBAN (International Bank Account Number) format or in BBAN format (for domestic payments).

References 

Society for Worldwide Interbank Financial Telecommunication